Kollekt is the sixth album by the Finnish experimental rock band Circle, led by bass guitarist Jussi Lehtisalo. It was released in 1998 by Bad Vugum. It collects the band's early singles, and previously unreleased songs from sessions for their first album, Meronia.

Track listing
 Point (2:53)
 Fone (2:46)
 Depoint (4:28)
 Crawatt (3:55)
 Circus (1:13)
 Silver (3:03)
 Polka (1:46)
 Ed-Visio (4:21)
 Armond (3:17)
 Hypto (8:32)
 Superb (2:54)
 Aspirites (5:46)
 DNA (3:32)
 Independence (3:53)

References

Circle (band) albums
1998 compilation albums